Lonely Robot can refer to:

Lonely Robot, a solo project by English musician John Mitchell
The Lonely Robot, an EP by American synthpop group Future Bible Heroes